The initial singularity is a singularity predicted by some models of the Big Bang theory to have existed before the Big Bang and thought to have contained all the energy and spacetime of the Universe. The instant immediately following the initial singularity is part of the Planck epoch, the earliest period of time in the history of our universe.

Traditional models of our Universe

The use of only general relativity to predict what happened in the beginnings of the Universe has been heavily criticized, as quantum mechanics becomes a significant factor in the high-energy environment of the earliest Universe, and general relativity on its own fails to make accurate predictions. In response to the inaccuracy of considering only general relativity, as in the traditional model of the Big Bang, alternative theoretical formulations for the beginning of the Universe have been proposed, including a string theory-based model in which two branes, enormous membranes much larger than the Universe, collided, creating mass and energy.

Although there is no direct evidence for a singularity of infinite density, the cosmic microwave background is evidence that the universe expanded from a very hot, dense state.

Alternatives to the singularity
Various new models of what preceded and caused the Big Bang have been proposed as a result of the problems created by quantum mechanics. One model, using loop quantum gravity, aims to explain the beginnings of the Universe through a series of Big Bounces, in which quantum fluctuations cause the Universe to expand. This procreation also predicts a cyclic model of universes, with a new universe being created after an old one is destroyed, each with different physical constants. 

Another procreation based on M-theory and observations of the cosmic microwave background (CMB), states that the Universe is but one of many in a multiverse, and has budded off from another universe as a result of quantum fluctuations, as opposed to our Universe being all that exists.

References

Big Bang
Physical cosmology